John Noone (born 1936) is a British writer. He was born in Darlington, County Durham, into a family of mixed Irish-Scots heritage. He graduated from King's College, Newcastle. He served in the Suez Canal Zone as part of his National Service, and returned to Egypt in 1961 to teach at Alexandria University. Since then, he has lived and worked in Libya, Japan and France.

His first novel The Man with the Chocolate Egg won the Geoffrey Faber Memorial Prize in 1967. His second novel The Night of Accomplishment was also well-received. His short stories have been collected in the volume Like As Not. He is known for two other specialist works: The Man Behind the Iron Mask (first published in 1988 and revised several times since), and Turtle Tortoise, Image and Symbol.

References

British writers
1936 births
Living people